Henry Spiering (June 7, 1831 – June 16, 1908) was an American editor and politician.

Born in Brandenberg, Prussia, Spiering emigrated with his parents to the United States in 1846 and went to Milwaukee, Wisconsin Territory. In 1849, Spiering settled in Mayville, Wisconsin. Spiering was a printer and editor of the newspapers Horicon Volksfreund and the Horicon News. He served as chairman of the Williamstown Town Board and as the Williamstown town treasurer. He was also clerk and president of the village of Mayville. In 1879, 1883 and 1887, he served in the Wisconsin State Assembly and was a Democrat. Spiering died in Mayville after a short illness.

Notes

1831 births
1908 deaths
German emigrants to the United States
People from Brandenburg
People from Mayville, Wisconsin
Editors of Wisconsin newspapers
Mayors of places in Wisconsin
19th-century American politicians
Democratic Party members of the Wisconsin State Assembly